Freefall style is a category of sport skydiving competition. Competitors aim to perform a predefined series of aerial maneuvers including front and back flips (loops), turns, and rolls in the least amount of time. Competitors are timed for the length they take to perform the series of maneuvers. Penalty time is added to a competitor's score for incomplete or incorrect maneuvers, and the competitor with the lowest time wins.

Freefall style is one of the oldest forms of sport skydiving competition.

Freefall style competition skydives are often coupled with Accuracy landing competition, and are commonly known as "Style and Accuracy" jumps.

See also
Freefall
Parachuting

Parachuting